The Hans Schneider Prize in Linear Algebra is awarded every three years by the International Linear Algebra Society. It recognizes research, contributions, and achievements at the highest level of linear algebra and was first awarded in 1993. It may be awarded for an outstanding scientific achievement or for lifetime contributions and may be awarded to more than one recipient. The award honors Hans Schneider, "one of the most influential mathematicians of the 20th Century in the field of linear algebra and matrix analysis.” The prize includes a plaque, certificate and/or a monetary award.

Recipients 
The recipients of the Hans Schneider Prize in Linear Algebra are:

 1993: Miroslav Fiedler
 1993: Shmuel Friedland
 1993: Israel Gohberg
 1996: Mike Boyle
 1996: David Handelman
 1996: Robert C. Thompson
 1999: 
 2002: Tsuyoshi Ando
 2002: Peter Lancaster
 2005: Richard A. Brualdi
 2005: Richard S. Varga
 2010: Cleve Moler
 2010: Beresford Parlett
 2013: Thomas J. Laffey
 2016: Rajendra Bhatia
 2016: 
 2019: Lek-Heng Lim
 2019: Volker Mehrmann
 2022: Pauline van den Driessche
 2022: Nicholas Higham

See also

 List of mathematics awards

References 

Mathematics awards